Chukva is a village in Sambir Raion (district), Lviv Oblast (province), Ukraine. It belongs to Ralivka rural hromada, one of the hromadas of Ukraine.

References

Villages in Sambir Raion